The Redwood Massacre is a 2014 British slasher film directed by David Ryan Keith, starring Lisa Cameron, Mark Wood, Lisa Livingstone, Rebecca Wilkie, Adam Coutts and Lee Hutcheon. The film received a sequel in 2020, titled, Redwood Massacre: Annihilation.

Cast
 Lisa Cameron as Pamela
 Mark Wood as Bruce
 Lisa Livingstone as Kirsty
 Rebecca Wilkie as Jessica
 Adam Coutts as Mark
 Lee Hutcheon as Hunter

Reception
The film received a rating of 4 out of 5 in Horror Society. Mark L. Miller of Ain't It Cool News wrote a positive review of the film, writing that "if you’re not the type to nitpick things like plot holes and lack of motivation, you’re bound to have a good time with this gory slasher yarn." 

Jon Dickinson of Scream rated the film 2 stars out of 4, writing that "by placing focus on visuals the film lacks any ability to evoke an emotional response other than disgust which is a real shame". Ian Sedensky of Culture Crypt gave the film a score of 50 out of 100, calling it "one of those disposable movies where some short time after the fact, you’ll be unable to recall if you actually saw it or not." Matt Boiselle of Dread Central rated the film 2.5 stars out of 5, writing that "If it’s a color-by-numbers kill-a-thon that you’re after, then feel free to dive headfirst into The Redwood Massacre, but please stay in the shallow end, as the lifeguard is now off duty."  Joel Harley of Nerdly rated the film 2 stars out of 5, writing that it "feels too long, annoys too frequently and is simply too unoriginal to whole-heartedly recommend".

References

British slasher films
2010s slasher films
2014 films

External links